Peter Gow may refer to:

 Peter Gow (politician) (1818–1886), Ontario businessman and political figure
 Peter Gow (anthropologist) (born 1958), social anthropologist